The Amazonian barred woodcreeper (Dendrocolaptes certhia) is a species of bird in the Dendrocolaptinae subfamily, the woodcreepers. The northern barred woodcreeper (D. sanctithomae) was formerly included in this species. The Amazonian barred woodcreeper still includes the subspecies concolor, which sometimes is considered a separate species, the concolor woodcreeper.

It is found in the entire Amazon Basin of Brazil and the Guianas in the northeast, (Guyana, Suriname, and French Guiana). The countries surrounding the basin at the Andes are southern Colombia and Venezuela, also Ecuador, Peru, and Bolivia. Its natural habitat is subtropical or tropical moist lowland forests.

Taxonomy
The Amazonian barred woodcreeper was described by the French polymath Georges-Louis Leclerc, Comte de Buffon in 1780 in his Histoire Naturelle des Oiseaux from two specimens collected in Cayenne, French Guiana. The bird was also illustrated in a hand-coloured plate engraved by François-Nicolas Martinet in the Planches Enluminées D'Histoire Naturelle which was produced under the supervision of Edme-Louis Daubenton to accompany Buffon's text.  Neither the plate caption nor Buffon's description included a scientific name but in 1783 the Dutch naturalist Pieter Boddaert coined the binomial name Picus certhia in his catalogue of the Planches Enluminées. The Amazonian barred woodcreeper is now one of five woodcreepers placed in the genus Dendrocolaptes that was introduced by the French naturalist Johann Hermann in 1804. The generic name is from the Ancient Greek dendrokolaptēs meaning "woodpecker". The specific epithet certhia is from the Ancient Greek kerthios, a word used by Aristotle for an unidentified small insectivorous bird.

Seven subspecies are recognised:
 D. c. certhia (Boddaert, 1783) – east Colombia, Venezuela, the Guianas and north Brazil
 D. c. radiolatus Sclater, PL & Salvin, 1868 – southeast Colombia, east Ecuador, northeast Peru and northwest Brazil
 D. c. juruanus von Ihering, H, 1905 – east, southeast Peru, north, west, central Bolivia and west Brazil
 D. c. concolor Pelzeln, 1868 – northeast Bolivia and south central Brazil in the Madeira-Tapajós interfluvium
 D. c. medius Todd, 1920 – northeast Brazil south of the Amazon and east of the Tocantins River
 D. c. retentus Batista et al., 2013 – north central Brazil in the Xingu-Tocantins interfluvium
 D. c. ridgwayi Hellmayr, 1905 – northcentral Brazil in the Tapajós-Xingu interfluvium

References

External links
"Barred woodcreeper"-Dendrocolaptes certhia photo gallery VIREO
Photo-High Res-Dendrocolaptes certhia; Article-2; Article seplan.to.gov.br-"Flora and Fauna"

Amazonian barred woodcreeper
Birds of the Amazon Basin
Birds of the Guianas
Birds of Brazil
Taxa named by Pieter Boddaert
Amazonian barred woodcreeper
Taxonomy articles created by Polbot